BMC Endocrine Disorders is a peer-reviewed open-access medical journal covering research in all aspects of the prevention, diagnosis, and management of endocrine disorders, as well as related molecular genetics, pathophysiology, and epidemiology.

External links

BioMed Central academic journals
English-language journals
Endocrinology journals
Creative Commons Attribution-licensed journals